Half God is the third studio album by American rapper Wiki. It is entirely produced by American rapper and record producer Navy Blue. The album was released on October 1, 2021, via Wiki's Wikset Enterprise label. Writing of the album began in November of 2020 with "All I Need."

Critical reception

At Metacritic, which assigns a weighted average score out of 100 to reviews from professional critics, the album received an average score of 84, based on 5 reviews, indicating "universal acclaim".

Accolades

Track listing
All tracks produced by Navy Blue.

References

External links
 

2021 albums
Hip hop albums by American artists